Kenzo Cotton (born May 13, 1996) is an American sprinter. Cotton competed in the boy's 100 meters at the 2013 World Youth Championships in Athletics. Cotton is 2015 NCAA Division I Outdoor Track and Field Championships 4x100 m champion, a 19-time NCAA Division I All-American and Southeastern Conference champion. Cotton won two Junior Olympic Championship titles, and won two USA (U 18) titles.

Career
Cotton is a 2 time Junior Olympic Champion, and won 2 USA (U 18) titles.

NCAA
Cotton is 2015 NCAA Division I Outdoor Track and Field Championships 4x100 m champion, a 19-time NCAA Division I All-American and Southeastern Conference champion.

Early life and prep
Cotton won 2014 Nebraska Gatorade Track Athlete of the Year.

Cotton won 2013 Nebraska Gatorade Track Athlete of the Year.

Cotton graduated from Papillion La Vista High School c/o 2014 as a 8-time outdoor track and field NSAA state champion with high school personal best times of 21.30 (200 meters) and 47.66 (400 meters) which were Nebraska state records.

Cotton also held a personal best long jump of 20' 11.5.

In 2014, Cotton placed 1st in the 200 m (21.91) and 1st in the 400 m (47.66) at Nebraska State Activities Association A state meet.

References

External links

Kenzo Cotton at Arkansas Razorbacks

Kenzo Cotton football recruiting profile at ncsasports.org

1996 births
Living people
American male sprinters
People from Nebraska
Sportspeople from Nebraska
Sportspeople from Omaha, Nebraska
Track and field athletes from Nebraska
Arkansas Razorbacks men's track and field athletes
University of Arkansas alumni
Players of American football from Nebraska